Joseph Alphonse Léo Cadieux,  (May 28, 1908 – May 11, 2005) was a Canadian politician.

A newspaper journalist and publisher who was born in Saint-Jérôme, Quebec, Cadieux was first elected to the House of Commons of Canada as the Liberal Member of Parliament for Terrebonne, Quebec in the 1962 election.

In 1965, he was appointed to the Cabinet by Prime Minister Lester Pearson as Associate Minister of National Defence. In 1967, he was promoted to Minister of National Defence (and the first Francophone to hold the post), and remained in that position under Pearson and then Pierre Trudeau until he retired from politics in 1970.

On his retirement from Parliament, he was appointed Canada's Ambassador to France. He remained Canada's envoy until 1975.

During Cadieux's tenure as Defence Minister, Canada cut its troop commitment to Europe from 10,000 to 5,000 troops and ended Canada's commitment to send re-enforcements to the North Atlantic Treaty Organization's Central Front following a review of Canadian defence priorities. In Cabinet debates on Canada's attitude towards nuclear deterrence, Cadieux argued in support of the doctrine. He also oversaw the reorganization of the Canadian Emergency Measures Organization, Canada's civil defence agency.

In 1974, he was made an Officer of the Order of Canada.

Electoral record

External links
 
 Order of Canada Citation
 Foreign Affairs and International Trade Canada Complete List of Posts 

1908 births
2005 deaths
Ambassadors of Canada to France
Liberal Party of Canada MPs
Defence ministers of Canada
Members of the House of Commons of Canada from Quebec
Members of the King's Privy Council for Canada
Officers of the Order of Canada
People from Saint-Jérôme
French Quebecers